Frank Evans (7 April 1925 – 24 July 1996) was a British middle-distance runner. He competed in the men's 800 metres at the 1952 Summer Olympics.

References

External links
 

1925 births
1996 deaths
Athletes (track and field) at the 1952 Summer Olympics
British male middle-distance runners
Olympic athletes of Great Britain
Place of birth missing